Michopdo (also, Ma-chuc-na, Ma-chuck-nas, Mich-op-do, Michoapdos, Mitshopda, and Wachuknas) is a former Maidu settlement in Butte County, California. It lay at an elevation of 187 feet (57 m).

References

External links

Former settlements in Butte County, California
Former Native American populated places in California
Maidu villages